Alfonso Herrero Peinador (born 21 April 1994) is a Spanish footballer who plays for CD Mirandés as a goalkeeper.

Club career
Born in Toledo, Castile-La Mancha, Herrero joined Real Madrid's youth setup in 2003, aged nine. He made his senior debut for the C-team on 24 August 2013, starting in a 1–0 Segunda División B away win against Atlético Madrid B.

Herrero was promoted to the reserves in 2014, after the side was relegated to the third division. He made his debut for the side on 24 August of that year, again against Atleti's B-team, but in a 1–2 loss.

Herrero spent his two seasons at the B's as a backup, the first to Rubén Yáñez and the second to Carlos Abad. On 22 July 2016 he signed a three-year contract with Real Oviedo, being initially assigned to the reserve team in Tercera División.

Ahead of the 2017–18 campaign, Herrero was definitely promoted to the first team after Esteban's retirement. He made his professional debut on 6 September 2017, starting in a 0–1 home loss against CD Numancia, for the season's Copa del Rey.

Herrero made his Segunda División debut on 25 November 2017, starting in a 3–1 home win against CD Numancia. He subsequently became the first-choice for Juan Antonio Anquela's side, overtaking Juan Carlos.

On 29 August 2020, free agent Herrero signed for Marbella FC in the third division. The following 5 July, he returned to the second level after agreeing to a contract with Burgos CF.

On 16 July 2022, Herrero signed a one-year deal with CD Mirandés, still in the second tier.

References

External links
Real Madrid profile 

1994 births
Living people
Sportspeople from Toledo, Spain
Spanish footballers
Footballers from Castilla–La Mancha
Association football goalkeepers
Segunda División players
Segunda División B players
Tercera División players
Real Madrid C footballers
Real Madrid Castilla footballers
Real Oviedo Vetusta players
Real Oviedo players
Marbella FC players
Burgos CF footballers
CD Mirandés footballers
Spain youth international footballers